Ivaylo Ilarionov is a retired Bulgarian association football forward and midfielder who played professionally in Bulgaria, Austria and the United States.

Ilarionov began his career with PFC CSKA Sofia in Bulgaria.  In 1995, he came to the United States for the summer, playing for the Chattanooga Railroaders in the 1995 USISL Professional League.  In 1996, Ilarionov was transferred to Admira Wacker Wien. During the 1997-1998, he is only shown as playing three games for SV Gerasdorf. In 1998, Ilarionov moved permanently to the United States, signing with the Nashville Metros in the USISL A-League.  In 1999, he moved to the Charleston Battery for two seasons.  In 2001, he played five games for the Atlanta Silverbacks.  He returned to the Silverbacks for the 2004 and 2005 seasons.

References

External links

1973 births
Living people
Bulgarian footballers
Bulgarian expatriate footballers
PFC CSKA Sofia players
PFC Spartak Pleven players
Chattanooga Express players
PFC Velbazhd Kyustendil players
FC Admira Wacker Mödling players
Nashville Metros players
Charleston Battery players
Atlanta Silverbacks players
First Professional Football League (Bulgaria) players
USL Second Division players
A-League (1995–2004) players
USL First Division players
Association football forwards
Association football midfielders
Expatriate soccer players in the United States
Bulgarian expatriate sportspeople in the United States
Expatriate footballers in Austria
Bulgarian expatriate sportspeople in Austria